Louis François Dufour, Jr. (26 July 1901 – 26 October 1982) was a Swiss ice hockey player who competed in the 1920 Summer Olympics and in the 1928 Winter Olympics. In 1920 he participated with the Swiss ice hockey team in the Summer Olympics ice hockey tournament along with his father, Louis Dufour Sr. Four years later he was also a member of the Swiss team in the first Winter Olympics tournament, though he did not play any games. At the 1928 Olympics he won the bronze medal with the Swiss ice hockey team.

References

External links
 

1901 births
1982 deaths
Ice hockey players at the 1920 Summer Olympics
Ice hockey players at the 1928 Winter Olympics
Medalists at the 1928 Winter Olympics
Olympic bronze medalists for Switzerland
Olympic ice hockey players of Switzerland
Olympic medalists in ice hockey